John George (born Tufei Fatella, January 20, 1898 – August 25, 1968) was an actor who appeared in at least 130 movies from 1916 to 1960. George worked in films of all genres alongside countless stars although often for only the briefest of appearances, uncredited.

Early years
George was born in Aleppo, Syria. Little is known about his early life but he immigrated to the United States around 1911 and searched for his mother and sisters who seem to have settled in the Nashville, Tennessee, area.

Film
Eventually George found his way to Los Angeles and the early silent film industry. George may have begun his career in the Joseph De Grasse movie Bobbie of the Ballet (1916) as an uncredited "tenement dweller". George may have even appeared earlier than that in the 1915 serial The Broken Coin unbilled, as an actor who strongly favors him appears in a still photo from the chapter play with Francis Ford and Grace Cunard in Daniel Blum's Pictorial History of the Silent Screen.

George went on to appear in Rex Ingram's Gothic melodrama Black Orchids (1917) as a character named Ali Bara. George worked in dozens of movies for Rex Ingram until 1926 when Ingram, tired of George's gambling, sent him home on a bus.

George became a regular in several 1920s silent films with Lon Chaney both at Universal Studios and Metro-Goldwyn-Mayer, including The Road to Mandalay, The Big City, The Hunchback of Notre Dame, Outside The Law and The Unknown. He also appeared in the Warner Brothers production Don Juan (1926) opposite John Barrymore, where he was the cruel dwarf Castle Keeper/Informer who delighted in exposing to Don Jose (Don Juan's father) the infidelities of his wife with another man. He also played Barnaby's minion in the 1934 Babes in Toyland. George continued to appear in movie after movie until some time near his death. One of his last roles was in 1956, an uncredited one as “A Barfly” in James Arness's TV Western Series Gunsmoke, S1E21's “Helping Hand”.

Death
On August 25, 1968, George died from emphysema at age 70 in Los Angeles.

Partial filmography

 The Broken Coin (1915)
 Bobbie of the Ballet (1916)
 The Chalice of Sorrow (1916)
 Black Orchids (1917)
 Pay Me! (1917)
 Bound in Morocco (1918)
 Friends and Frauds (1918)*short
 Outside the Law (1920)
 Turn to the Right (1922)
 The Prisoner of Zenda (1922)
 Trifling Women (1922)
 Where the Pavement Ends (1923)
 Scaramouche (1923)
 When a Girl Loves (1924)
 Mare Nostrum (1926)
 The Volga Boatman (1926)
 The Road to Mandalay (1926)
 The Bells (1926)
 Don Juan (1926)
 The Night of Love (1927)
 The Unknown (1927)
 The Road to Romance (1927)
 The Big City (1928)
 Condemned (1929)
 Outside the Law (1930)
 Sherlock Holmes (1932)
 Babes in Toyland (1934)
 More About Nostradamus (1941)
 Adventure in Iraq (1943)
 The Devil's Playground (1946)
 Kiss the Blood Off My Hands (1948)
 Mesa of Lost Women (1953)
 Oceans 11 (1960)

See also
Fu Manchu
Golden Age of Hollywood
Republic Pictures
Where the Pavement Ends (1923)

References

Classic Horror website

External links

Still of John George from Don Juan (1926)
Spanish website devoted to John George and other well known little people personalities
John George in The Unknown (1927)

1898 births
1968 deaths
American male silent film actors
American people of Syrian descent
Actors with dwarfism
Emigrants from the Ottoman Empire to the United States
People from Aleppo
Syrian male film actors
20th-century American male actors